Les Afriques is a weekly economical and financial African newspaper. In 2007, it claims to be the first Pan-African financial newspaper. It is published weekly and available in almost all French-speaking countries.

History 
The newspaper started its publication in July 2007. Its launch was announced on the French-language TV Journal de Léman bleu and on several specialised African websites.

After a first journal and a necessary period of adaptation using a franchise system, the journal Les Afriques launched local editions for Morocco, Senegal and Cameroon.

Objectives 
In order to balance the views of the "old continent", the journalist are based in Africa (Morocco, Senegal and Algeria) and are highly respected in the African financial community.

Journalists

Adama Wade, Morocco 
Adama Wade, a Mauritanian national, established in Casablanca for at least thirteen years. He has flourished as a journalist in the Economic and Financial sections in the Moroccan press.

Chérif Elvalide Seye, Senegal 
He was a special advisor to the communication for president Abdoulaye Wade 2000–2002 and he has created or managed several media entities in his country. Chérif Seye died on June 18, 2012 in Nairobi Kenya

References

External links 

2007 establishments in Switzerland
Business newspapers
Business in Africa
French-language newspapers published in Switzerland
Newspapers published in Geneva
Publications established in 2007
Weekly newspapers published in Switzerland